Vladyslav Ihnatyev (born 25 October 1997) is a Ukrainian football midfielder.

Career
Ihnatyev is a product of FC Shakhtar, FC Krystal and FC Metalurh Zaporizhzhia youth sportive systems.

He made his debut for Metalurh Zaporizhzhia in the Ukrainian Premier League in a match against FC Dynamo Kyiv on 4 December 2015.

References

External links
 
 

1997 births
Living people
Sportspeople from Kherson
Ukrainian footballers
Association football midfielders
FC Dynamo Kyiv players
FC Metalurh Zaporizhzhia players
FC Chornomorets Odesa players
FC Krystal Kherson players
FC Inhulets Petrove players
Ukrainian Premier League players
Ukrainian First League players
Ukrainian Second League players
Ukrainian Amateur Football Championship players